Deudorix vansoni, the Van Son's playboy, is a butterfly of the family Lycaenidae. It is found from northern KwaZulu-Natal to Eswatini, then along the Lebombo foothills to southern Mpumalanga and north to Zimbabwe and Malawi.

The wingspan is 20–23 mm for males and 20–26 mm for females. Adults are on wing year-round with a peak from September to October.

The larvae feed on Acacia caffra and Acacia burkei, causing stem galls on the twigs.

References

Butterflies described in 1948
Deudorigini
Deudorix